Chala Kelele (born 7 October 1966) is a retired Ethiopian runner who specialized in cross-country running. He represented Ethiopia at six editions of the IAAF World Cross Country Championships, as well as the 1994 IAAF World Half Marathon Championships and in the IAAF World Road Relay Championships.

International competitions

References

1966 births
Living people
Ethiopian male long-distance runners
African Games medalists in athletics (track and field)
African Games bronze medalists for Ethiopia
Athletes (track and field) at the 1991 All-Africa Games
Ethiopian male cross country runners
20th-century Ethiopian people
21st-century Ethiopian people